The SS Waco Victory was a Victory ship built during World War II under the Emergency Shipbuilding program. She was launched by the California Shipbuilding Company on July 22, 1944, and completed on October 14, 1944. The ship's United States Maritime Commission designation was 'VC2- S- AP3, hull number 37'. The 10,500-ton Victory ships were designed to replace the earlier Liberty Ships. Liberty ships were designed to be used just for World War II compared to Victory ships, which were designed to last longer and serve the US Navy after the war. Victory ships differed from Liberty ships in that they were faster, longer and wider, taller, had a thinner stack set farther toward the superstructure, and had a long raised forecastle.

Following World War II service, Waco Victory was sold to Belgium where she served as the SS Vinkt from 1947 to 1965. She was eventually resold to Liberia in 1965 where she served as the SS Hongkong Grace until she was damaged in a collision with the SS Mina in 1973. Deemed beyond repair,  she was eventually scrapped.

Accidents and incidents
1967: Severally damaged in a collision with the SS Linda; later repaired.

1973: Severally damaged in a collision with the SS Mina; scrapped soon after.

References 

Victory ships
Ships built in Los Angeles
United States Merchant Marine
1944 ships
World War II merchant ships of the United States
Cargo liners